A scoop wheel or scoopwheel is a pump, usually used for land drainage.

A scoop wheel pump is similar in construction to a water wheel, but works in the opposite manner: a waterwheel is water-powered and used to drive machinery, a scoop wheel is engine-driven and is used to lift water from one level to another.  Principally used for land drainage, early scoop wheels were wind-driven but later steam-powered beam engines were used. It can be regarded as a form of pump.

A scoop wheel produces a lot of spray. They were frequently encased in a brick building.  To maintain efficiency when the river into which the water was discharged was of variable level, or tidal, a 'rising breast' was used, a sort of inclined sluice.  The basic construction is, of necessity, similar to an undershot water wheel.

The individual blades were frequently called ladles.

Scoop wheels have been used in land drainage in Northern Germany, in the Netherlands, and in the UK, and occasionally elsewhere in the world. They began to be replaced in the mid 19th century by centrifugal pumps.

An interesting comparison between the two types of pumps is available, because a  vertical spindle centrifugal pump was installed at Prickwillow on the River Lark in Cambridgeshire, alongside an existing  scoop wheel. A series of tests were carried out in 1880, to check their efficiency. The scoop wheel lifted 71.45 tons per minute through , with the engine indicating that it was developing , while the newer installation was developing , and raised 75.93 tons per minute through . Efficiency was calculated as 46 per cent for the scoop wheel and 52.79 per cent for the centrifugal pump.

See also
Noria
 Sakia
Dredger

Pumping stations employing a scoop wheel
Dogdyke Engine, Lincolnshire
Pinchbeck Engine, Lincolnshire
Pode Hole, Lincolnshire (scoop wheel no longer present)
Stretham Old Engine, Cambridgeshire
Westonzoyland Pumping Station Museum, Somerset (scoop wheel no longer present)

References

Bibliography

External links

Berney Arms windmill, preserved by English Heritage
Summary of scoopwheel history
An american example, sadly without pictures of the wheel

Drainage
Industrial archaeology
Pumps